The 1845 Alabama gubernatorial election took place on August 4, 1845, in order to elect the governor of Alabama. Term started on December 10, 1845. Independent Joshua L. Martin won his only term as Governor with 53.5% of the vote.

Candidates

Independent Party
Joshua L. Martin, Member of the U.S. House of Representatives from 1835 to 1839.

Democratic Party
Nathaniel Terry

Whig Party
Nicholas Davis, previous candidate for this seat in 1831 and member of the Alabama House of Representatives from 1819 to 1820.

Election

References

Alabama gubernatorial elections
1845 Alabama elections
Alabama
August 1845 events